Hasan Doğan is the Chief of the Cabinet of the Turkish President.

Hasan Doğan was born in Ankara, the capital of Turkey. He completed his primary, secondary and high school education in Ankara. He graduated theology at Ankara University and law at  Ankara Atilim University. He obtained master (2002) and doctoral degrees (2008) at The Social Sciences Institute, Ankara University.

He worked as a broadcaster at a local radio station based in Ankara and as a teacher between 1998 and 2002 and served deputy chairman at Justice and Development Party's Youth Branches Organization between 2001 and 2003.

He became the chief of the cabinet of the Prime Ministry of Turkey in 2008 and since 2014 he is the chief of the cabinet of the President

References

External links
Erdoğan’a yeni özel kalem müdürü
İşte Yeni Özel Kalem Müdürü
Özel kalem müdürü doktora öğrencisi

1977 births
Living people
Politicians from Ankara
Ankara University alumni
Turkish civil servants